Mecklenburgische Kleinseenplatte is an Amt in the Mecklenburgische Seenplatte district, in Mecklenburg-Vorpommern, Germany. The seat of the Amt is in Mirow.

The Amt Mecklenburgische Kleinseenplatte consists of the following municipalities:
 Mirow
 Priepert
 Roggentin
 Wesenberg
 Wustrow

Ämter in Mecklenburg-Western Pomerania
Mecklenburgische Seenplatte (district)